The 1962 Copa de Campeones de América was the third edition of South America's premier club football tournament. Ten teams entered, one more than the previous season, with Venezuela again not sending a representative. This was the first edition in which the defending champions qualified automatically, allowing the nation which contained the holders to have an extra team in the tournament.

Santos ended the Carboneros''' reign, as they defeated Peñarol 0–3 in the deciding playoff in Buenos Aires.

Qualified teams

Format and tie-breaking criteria
This season saw the competition have an increase in participants by one team; as a result, the preliminary round from the previous season was eliminated. The first phase was now a group phase of three groups containing three clubs each. The format for the semifinals and the finals remained the same.

At each stage of the tournament teams receive 2 points for a win, 1 point for a draw, and no points for a loss. If two or more teams are equal on points, the following criteria will be applied to determine the ranking in the group stage:

a one-game playoff;
superior goal difference;
draw of lots.

Starting this edition, a playoff will become the first tie-breaker, then goal difference.

First round
Nine teams were drawn into three groups. In each group, teams played against each other home-and-away. The top team in each group advanced to the Semifinals. Peñarol, the title holders, had a bye to the next round.

Group 1

Group 2

Group 3

Semifinals
Four teams were drawn into two groups. In each group, teams played against each other home-and-away. The top team in each group advanced to the Finals.

Group A

Group BPeñarol progressed to the finals due to better goal difference.''

Finals

Champion

Top goalscorers

Footnotes

External links
1962 Copa Libertadores at RSSSF
1962 Copa Libertadores at Cero a Cero

1
Copa Libertadores seasons